Burt Myers (born December 30, 1975) is a race car driver on NASCAR's Whelen Southern Modified Tour.  In 1999, at the age of 23, he became the youngest Bowman Gray Stadium track champion in history and would go on to win 9 more titles in 2001, 2007, 2010, 2011, 2013, 2016, 2017, 2018, and 2019. He has won more pole awards than any other driver in the Whelen Southern Modified Tour's history.
Myers has 19 career wins and won the 2010 and 2016 NASCAR Whelen Southern Modified Tour Championship.

History

In 1952 Bobby Myers, Burt's great uncle, set the record for the youngest driver ever to win a Stadium title at the age of 25. Bobby won 16 Races and 1 championship in 1952. Five years later, in 1957, Bobby was killed in a crash at Darlington Raceway in Darlington, South Carolina while driving for Lee Petty. Billy Myers was Burt Myers grandpa and he ranks 20th with 22 victories on Bowman Gray Stadium's Modified All-Time Wins List, and he has won 3 championships ('51,'53,'55). Billy died at Bowman Gray Stadium. In 1999, at the age of 23, Burt Myers broke his great uncle's record.

Burt's father, Gary Myers, is the second generation of Myers' to compete at Bowman Gray Stadium.  Gary ranks seventh on the stadium's all-time victory list with a total of thirty-eight (38) wins.  In addition, he was the 1996 champion on the NASCAR Whelen Southern Modified Tour.

In 2009 Myers made his NASCAR Camping World Truck Series debut at Martinsville Speedway in the Kroger 200. He drove the No. 07 JRC Investments / Wyatt Winstead Foundation Chevrolet owned by Ken Smith. He would start 17th and finish 19th, one lap down.

Myers was put on probation by NASCAR for the 2009 racing season at Bowman Gray Stadium, along with fellow competitor Junior Miller, as result of his actions in 2008 final race.

He was featured in Madhouse, a History Channel television documentary series that followed the drivers at Bowman Gray Stadium for a racing season, as well as the Discovery Channel series Race Night at Bowman Gray.
He is also a ten-time champion at Bowman Gray Stadium.

Motorsports career results

NASCAR
(key) (Bold – Pole position awarded by qualifying time. Italics – Pole position earned by points standings or practice time. * – Most laps led.)

Camping World Truck Series

Whelen Modified Tour

Whelen Southern Modified Tour

.

References

External links
 
 

NASCAR drivers
Living people
1975 births
People from Stokes County, North Carolina
Racing drivers from North Carolina